The Herenigde Nasionale Party (Reunited National Party) was a political party in South Africa during the 1940s. It was the product of the reunion of Daniel François Malan's Gesuiwerde Nasionale Party (Purified National Party) and J.B.M. Hertzog's breakaway Afrikaner nationalist faction of the United Party in 1940.

In 1934, Hertzog had fused his National Party with Jan Smuts's South African Party to form the United Party due to pressure from the electorate during the Great Depression. He split away in 1939, however, because he could not tolerate the idea of entering World War II on the side of the British.

Hertzog briefly led the new party but resigned after Malan and his faction rejected Hertzog's proposed platform of equality between British South Africans and Afrikaners. As a result, Malan became party leader and resumed his position as Leader of the Opposition. The Herenigde Nasionale Party gained popularity after the war and unexpectedly won the elections of 1948 with a majority of seats but a significant minority of the popular vote. Internationally it is known for the implementation of apartheid. After 1948, the HNP merged with the Afrikaner Party, another Afrikaner nationalist party led by one of Hertzog's protégés, and reverted to the short name, the Nasionale Party (National Party), which it retained until shortly after the fall of apartheid during the 1990s.

The initials of the Herenigde Nasionale Party, HNP, were later used by a breakaway party that was established in 1969, the rightwing Herstigte Nasionale Party (Reconstituted National Party).

1940 establishments in South Africa
Afrikaner nationalism
Defunct political parties in South Africa
Nationalist parties in South Africa
Organisations associated with apartheid
Political parties established in 1940
Political parties with year of disestablishment missing
Protestant political parties
White nationalist parties